The Sean McVay effect is a term used to describe a trend beginning in 2018 regarding the hiring practices of National Football League (NFL) teams towards employing young, offensive-minded coaches, but would later be expanded to describe the trend of hiring young head coaches in general. The phrase originates from Los Angeles Rams head coach Sean McVay, who when hired at 30 years old in 2017, became the youngest NFL head coach in the Super Bowl era (1966–present). McVay quickly turned the Rams into the league's highest-scoring offense, resulting in the team becoming perennial title contenders and eventual champions in Super Bowl LVI. Following McVay's success with the Rams, NFL teams increasingly began to hire relatively young head coaches that specialized in offensive strategy and later, young head coaches that focused on defensive strategy.

Background

On January 12, 2017, the Los Angeles Rams hired Washington Redskins (now the Washington Commanders) offensive coordinator Sean McVay, who was then 30 years old, as their head coach. He had previously started out on Washington's coaching staff in 2010 as an assistant tight ends coach before working his way up to becoming their offensive coordinator, a role he held for three years. His hire by the Rams made McVay the youngest NFL head coach in the Super Bowl era (1966–present) and the youngest since 1938 when the Rams hired Art Lewis at 27 years old. Prior to McVay's hiring, the four youngest head coaching hires in the Super Bowl era – Lane Kiffin, Raheem Morris, Dave Shula, and Josh McDaniels – had a combined win/loss record of 52–115 before being fired by their respective teams. 

McVay took over a Rams team that finished the 2016 season last in points, total yards and first downs, and were later ranked as the second-worst offense of the 2010s. Under McVay's new leadership, the Rams led the league in total offense in 2017, making them the first team in the modern era to go from last to first in total offense in a single season. The Rams also reached the playoffs in McVay's first season, ending a twelve-year postseason drought for the franchise. McVay received recognition from the league and the media for turning around the team's fortunes, and he was named AP NFL Coach of the Year at the season's conclusion, becoming the youngest coach to ever receive the award. 

The following season, McVay's second with the team, the Rams returned to the playoffs and won the 2018 NFC Championship Game against the New Orleans Saints. At age 33, this made McVay the youngest head coach to lead his team to the Super Bowl. The Rams ultimately lost Super Bowl LIII to the New England Patriots.

Coaching hiring trends after McVay
Following McVay's quick turnaround of the Rams, many NFL teams sought to replicate the strategy of hiring a young head coach that specialized in offensive strategy. Journalist Mark Maske of The Washington Post coined the term "Sean McVay effect" in the 2018 offseason, after McVay's first year as a head coach, in reference to the fact that both Kansas City Chiefs offensive coordinator Matt Nagy (39) and Philadelphia Eagles quarterbacks coach John DeFilippo (39) were expected to receive head coaching interviews. Maske cited McVay's instant success in his debut season as the reason the pair were receiving serious considerations, and stated that the two would have had to wait years for such opportunities under the previous circumstances. Nagy would soon be hired as the head coach of the Chicago Bears. 

In the wake of the Rams continued success during McVay's second year, the subsequent 2019 offseason had several more hires in the mold of McVay, with Matt LaFleur (39), Kliff Kingsbury (39), Adam Gase (40), Freddie Kitchens (44), and Zac Taylor (35) all becoming the head coaches of different teams. Many of these coaches were alleged to be hired due to their connections with McVay; LaFleur had previously served as McVay's offensive coordinator, Taylor was McVay's wide receivers coach and quarterbacks coach, while Kingsbury was initially touted as being "friends with Rams coach Sean McVay" upon the announcement of his hiring. A month after the 2019 season began, sportswriter Bill Barnwell quipped that "anyone who has ever worn a polo shirt around McVay is now an NFL head coach", while Taylor himself similarly mentioned several years later that "I think the joke is if you ever had a cup of coffee with Sean McVay, then you're going to be a head coach in the NFL". 

The trend of younger head coaches with offensive backgrounds continued for the next several years, with some of these coaching hires having worked with McVay in the past. Kevin O'Connell (36) came directly from the McVay coaching tree as the Rams' offensive coordinator before becoming head coach of the Minnesota Vikings. While Mike McDaniel (38) did not serve under McVay before being hired as head coach the Miami Dolphins, he worked on the Washington coaching staff from 2011–2013 alongside McVay, LaFleur and Kyle Shanahan, another relatively young offensive-minded head coach who was hired at the age of 37 by the San Francisco 49ers less than a month after McVay was hired by the Rams. 

Eventually, this movement would also be associated to the hiring of relatively younger head coaches that focused on defensive strategy as well. Brandon Staley (38), one of McVay's defensive coordinators on the Rams, was hired as the head coach of the crosstown Los Angeles Chargers after one year on McVay's staff. Upon his hiring, Staley was touted as "the Sean McVay of defense".

Furthermore, several of McVay's lower-level assistants were regularly hired throughout this period for offensive, defensive or special teams coordinator positions on other teams, including Shane Waldron, Joe Barry, Ejiro Evero, Wes Phillips, Dwayne Stukes and Matt Daniels. It was later reported that Seattle Seahawks quarterback Russell Wilson specifically favored hiring Waldron, who was then the Rams' passing game coordinator, as the Seahawks' offensive coordinator due to his experience on McVay's coaching staff and familiarity with McVay's offensive system. Waldron was also previously considered for the Cincinnati Bengals head coaching position that eventually went to Taylor.

Head coaching hires attributed to the "Sean McVay effect"

Impact

McVay and Cincinnati Bengals head coach Zac Taylor—aged 36 and 38, respectively—met in Super Bowl LVI on February 13, 2022. It was McVay's second appearance at the Super Bowl and Taylor's first, and marked the Super Bowl's youngest-ever head coaching matchup. With the Rams' victory, McVay became the youngest head coach to ever win a Super Bowl.

Between 2017, the season when McVay was hired by the Rams, and 2022, the season after his Super Bowl victory, fifteen different head coaches aged 40 or younger were hired. In contrast, twenty-two head coaches in the same age bracket were hired between 1990 and 2016. In the five years prior to McVay's hiring, roughly one-tenth of the head coaching vacancies were filled by someone 40 or younger; this rate effectively tripled in the five years after McVay became head coach of the Rams, with coaches under 40 making up a third of the hires. This caused the average age of NFL head coaches to decrease from 53.4 to 48.5 years old between 2016 and 2021.

It has been noted by some that this shift of younger, offensive coaches being hired has come at the expense of older coaches and coaches that specialized in defensive strategy. Three-quarters of available head coaching jobs went to offensive coaches between 2017 and 2019. By the end of that period only 10 out of 32 NFL coaches had defensive backgrounds.

Others have noted that this trend has done little to support hiring candidates from ethnic-minority backgrounds, an ongoing issue in the NFL. During the 2019 offseason when Taylor and Matt LaFleur were hired, only one of the eight open head coaching positions went to an African-American coach. Stephen Holder of The Athletic noted that in the 2021 season, there were more former McVay assistants serving in top positions than there were African-American head coaches. This has also been attributed to the lack of minorities on offensive coaching staffs, as 86% of the offensive coordinators between 1999 to 2021 have been Caucasian.

References

2018 neologisms
American football culture
American football terminology
Los Angeles Rams
National Football League culture